Local elections in Navotas were held on May 9, 2016, within the Philippine general election. The voters elected for the mayor, vice mayor, one congressman, and the councilors – six in each of the city's two districts.

Background
Incumbent Mayor John Rey Tiangco ran again without opponents. Vice Mayor Clint Geronimo also ran unopposed.

Navotas Representative Toby Tiangco, who was also the spokesman of the United Nationalist Alliance party of Vice President Jejomar Binay) also sought re-election, and faced independent candidate Dong Luna.

Candidates
Incumbents are represented in italics.

Representative, Lone District

Mayor

Vice Mayor

Councilors

District 1

|-
|colspan=5 bgcolor=black|

District 2

|-
|colspan=5 bgcolor=black|

References

External links
COMELEC's List of Local Candidates for Verification

2016 Philippine local elections
Elections in Navotas
2016 elections in Metro Manila